On 28 September 2021, Andrei Zeltser, a Belarusian IT worker, was killed in Minsk by members of the State Security Committee of the Republic of Belarus (Belarusian KGB) who conducted a raid on his apartment. After a door breaching, a shootout took place, in which Zeltser fatally shot one of the agents, and was subsequently killed by the KGB members. Zeltser was subsequently called a "terrorist" by the government. According to the state-owned Belarusian Telegraph Agency, "members of an extremist group with ties to the opposition, supposedly, lived in the apartment", referring to Zeltser, 31, and his wife, who was arrested. 

More than a hundred people were detained in the aftermath of the event, in connection to social media comments, and some were subsequently given prison sentences.

Andrei Zeltser 
Andrei Zeltser was an opposition supporter and has been described as a dissident. According to a media report, on 16  August 2021 he posted an image of the white-red-white historical flag of Belarus (which has been used as a symbol of the opposition to the regime of Alexander Lukashenko) and "made a call to the people to unite and fight for the future of the country". He worked for EPAM Systems, a Pennsylvania-headquartered software engineering company started by Belarusians. There was speculation that Zeltser was a citizen of the United States; a U.S. official said that more information on this is being sought.

Aftermath

Mass arrests 
An edited video of the incident, which was recorded on multiple cameras, was broadcast by Belarus state TV channels. This was followed by arrests of more than 100 people in connection to social media comments about the event, on charges of insulting a government official or inciting social hatred. By 3 November 2021, more than 136 people were detained for 'trying to whitewash' Zeltser's name in social networks. For more than a month, detainees were denied access to legal counsel. Human rights activists said that the prison officials had not allowed basic necessities to be delivered to the prisoners.

In February 2023, the Viasna Human Rights Centre reported that several of the detainees were released after having served their full sentences.

Arrest of Gennady Mozheiko 
Among the arrested was journalist , a correspondent of the Belarusian version of Komsomolskaya Pravda (KP v Belorusi). Mozheiko was detained in Moscow and sent to the Okrestina Detention Centre in Minsk. The Daily Telegraph reported on an allegation that he was subject to extraterritorial abduction in Moscow, by Belarusian agents; the official Belarusian account is that he was arrested in Belarus, upon crossing the border. He was jailed for having written a news piece that featured a former classmate of Zeltser describing him in positive terms; the article was published on September 28, 2021, and was deleted the next morning. The website of Komsomolskaya Pravda in Belarus was blocked by authorities on the same day; the newspaper ceased its operations in Minsk. Russia expressed dissatisfaction over these developments, based on an expectation that work of "[their] media outlets" would not be interfered with, while also citing freedom of the press.  Nevertheless, the Belarusian authorities charged Mozheiko with 'whitewashing a criminal'. As of October 16, 2021, Mozheiko is charged with 'inciting hatred' and 'an insult to a representative of the authority' under the articles of the State Criminal Code.

Official reactions 
On 1 October 2021, at the funeral of the KGB officer killed during the raid, Major General Oleg Belokonev publicly called for murdering members of the opposition as a revenge against hypothetical killings of state security officials:

Lukashenko held a minute's silence to honor the agent who was killed, and said that the government would "not forgive them [opposition supporters] for the death of this guy."

Opposition reactions 
Prominent opposition activist Pavel Latushko said that "a fair investigation (of the incident) is impossible under Lukashenko", and: "Not only Andrei Zeltser — a calm, kind and compassionate man — has been declared a terrorist. All of those who disagree with the regime have been declared terrorists."

Notes

References

External links
 18+. ШОКИРУЮЩЕЕ ВИДЕО. Сотрудник КГБ убит при исполнении служебных обязанностей, edited video of the event, released by the Belarusian Telegraph Agency on September 28, 2021

2021 in Belarus
2020–2021 Belarusian protests
Filmed killings by law enforcement
2021 deaths
2021 crimes in Belarus